Geodorcus montivagus is a large flightless species of stag beetle in the family Lucanidae. It is known from only one female specimen found on the Victoria Range in New Zealand.

Description
The specimen found has a body length, including its mandibles of 21.1mm. It has a black and glossy exoskeleton. The mandibles are short, arched and toothed.

Conservation
This species has been classified as data deficient under the New Zealand Threat Classification System .

References 

Lucaninae
Beetles of New Zealand
Endemic fauna of New Zealand
Beetles described in 2007
Endemic insects of New Zealand